USS Drusilla (SP-372) was a patrol vessel that served in the United States Navy from 1917 to 1918.
 
Drusilla was built as a private motorboat of the same name in 1914 by the New York Launch and Engine Company at Morris Heights in the Bronx, New York. On 22 May 1917, the U.S. Navy acquired her under a free lease from her owner, A. J. Drexel of Radnor, Pennsylvania, for use as a patrol boat during World War I. She was commissioned as USS Drusilla (SP-372) on 25 May 1917.

Assigned to the 4th Naval District, Drusilla served on the section patrol in the Delaware Bay area, performing harbor entrance and submarine net patrol duties for the remainder of World War I.

Drusilla was decommissioned on 10 December 1918. The Navy returned her to Drexel on 12 December 1918.

References
 
 Department of the Navy Naval History and Heritage Command Online Library of Selected Images: U.S. Navy Ships: USS Drusilla (SP-372), 1917–1918 Originally Drusilla (American Motor Boat, 1914)
 NavSource Online: Section Patrol Craft Photo Archive: Drusilla (SP 372)

Patrol vessels of the United States Navy
World War I patrol vessels of the United States
Ships built in Morris Heights, Bronx
1914 ships